The Global Digital Exemplar (GDE) programme is an NHS England initiative to achieve digital transformation in selected exemplar organisations and to create a knowledge sharing ecosystem to spread learning from these exemplars. The programme is to enable "digitally advanced" NHS trusts to share knowledge with other NHS trusts, specifically knowledge gained during the implementation of IT systems, and especially experience from introducing electronic health record (EHR) systems. The GDE project is expected to last two to three and a half years; with the most digitally advanced trusts on the shorter time scale.

Four rounds of exemplars have been announced so far — two waves of acute trust GDEs, and one wave each of ambulance trusts, and mental health trusts. In addition, eighteen acute trust "fast followers" have been partnered with the acute trusts.

The programme involves the investment of £395 million. Each GDE will receive "up to £10 million" to spend on digital projects. The funding must be matched locally, but not necessarily in cash.

Programme elements
Each Global Digital Exemplar (GDE) received £10 million and their matched Fast Followers (FFs) received £5 million (£5 million for GDEs and £3 million for FFs in mental health); and they were required to secure matched funding internally. The Healthcare Information and Management Systems Society (HIMSS) Electronic Medical Record Adoption Model (EMRAM) was chosen as a guide for programme outputs, with GDEs expect to obtain HIMSS Level 7 and FFs, HIMSS Level 5.

The partnerships between GDEs and FFs constitute a formal mechanism to support knowledge transfer. The programme also introduced the idea of "Blueprints", documents describing how to implement digital technologies in healthcare.

Exemplars

Acute exemplars
The first twelve exemplars were announced in 2016. A second wave added another four in 2017.

Although NHS England refers to this grouping of exemplars as "acute", a number of the hospitals operated by trusts within this group are specialised hospitals. Examples include, Alder Hey Children's Hospital and Western Eye Hospital.

North
Alder Hey Children's Hospital NHS Foundation Trust 
City Hospitals Sunderland NHS Foundation Trust
Newcastle upon Tyne Hospitals NHS Foundation Trust
Royal Liverpool and Broadgreen University Hospitals NHS Trust
Salford Royal NHS Foundation Trust
Wirral University Teaching Hospital NHS Foundation Trust

Midlands and East
Cambridge University Hospitals NHS Foundation Trust
University Hospitals Birmingham NHS Foundation Trust
Luton and Dunstable University Hospital NHS Foundation Trust
West Suffolk NHS Foundation Trust

London
Royal Free London NHS Foundation Trust
Imperial College Healthcare NHS Trust and Chelsea and Westminster Hospital NHS Foundation Trust (as a joint Exemplar)

South
Oxford University Hospitals NHS Foundation Trust
Taunton and Somerset NHS Foundation Trust
University Hospitals Bristol NHS Foundation Trust
University Hospital Southampton NHS Foundation Trust

Fast followers
There are eighteen acute "fast follower" trusts, each of which has been partnered with an acute GDE.

Ambulance exemplars
As of July 2018, there are three ambulance trust exemplars.
South Central Ambulance Service NHS Foundation Trust
West Midlands Ambulance Service NHS Foundation Trust
North East Ambulance Service NHS Foundation Trust

Mental health exemplars
There are currently seven mental health trust GDEs.
Berkshire Healthcare NHS Foundation Trust
Birmingham and Solihull Mental Health NHS Foundation Trust
Mersey Care NHS Foundation Trust
Northumberland, Tyne and Wear NHS Foundation Trust
Oxford Health NHS Foundation Trust
South London and Maudsley NHS Foundation Trust
Worcestershire Health and Care NHS Trust

See also
Department of Health and Social Care
Health informatics
Health information technology
NHS Digital

References

External links
NHS England Global Digital Exemplars
Independent evaluation of the programme

National Health Service (England)